Samuel Knight (1675–1746) was an English clergyman and antiquary.

Life
He was born in London the son of John Knight and attended St Paul's School, London and Trinity College, Cambridge (BA 1702, MA 1706), and received a Cambridge DD in 1706. He was ordained in 1704 and became chaplain to the Earl of Oxford. He was Rector of Borough Green, Cambridgeshire (1707-1746), Vicar of Chippenham, Cambridgeshire in 1707, Prebendary of Ely cathedral, (1714-1746) and Rector of Bluntisham, Huntingdonshire (1714-1746) .

He served as chaplain to King George II from 1730 to 1746 and as Archdeacon of Berkshire from 1735 to 1746. He was a prebendary of Lincoln from 1742 to 1746 .

Knight died on 9 December 1746 and was buried in Bluntisham Church. He had a son Samuel.

Works

He was a strong Protestant. In his biography of Erasmus, Knight argues, like many contemporary Protestants, that Erasmus was truly a Protestant at heart but did not fully express this during his lifetime.  He focuses on Erasmus' friends in England and English universities. he also wrote a biography of John Colet. He corresponded with Browne Willis in order to provide him with information on Ely Cathedral for Willis' publication Survey of Lincoln, Ely, Oxford, and Peterborough Cathedrals (1730).

References

 
 

1675 births
1746 deaths
Archdeacons of Berkshire
English antiquarians
People from Bluntisham
People educated at St Paul's School, London
Alumni of Trinity College, Cambridge